Bavoko is a village in the Bamingui-Bangoran Prefecture in the northern Central African Republic. This village produces both cotton and cash crops for export.

Populated places in Bamingui-Bangoran
N'Délé